Eve is an island in Seychelles, lying east of Praslin and west of Round Island, Seychelles. It has an area of 0.29 km2.

History
The island was created by land reclamation.

Geography
The island is located 100 meters to the east of Baie Sainte Anne.

Economics
The island has commercial port facilities.
Raffles are building some exclusive villas on the island  
A new sports complex will be opening in December 2016.

Transport
There is a 100 meters causeway to Praslin.

Image gallery

References 

Artificial islands of Seychelles
Islands of Baie Sainte Anne